PCMC Hockey Stadium also known as The Major Dhyanachand Stadium is a field hockey stadium in the city of Pune, India. It has a seating capacity of 5,000 people. It serves as the home ground of the hockey franchisee based in Pune Strykers, for World Series Hockey.

History
It was built in 1993, was the first polygrass stadium of the district. It costed 1.15 crore to build this stadium. Women's hockey matches of National Games which were held in 1993.

Major renovations
The stadium has been renovated by the PCMC Administration at a cost of 2.75 crore to improve the infrastructure at the stadium.  Four high-mast floodlights with a capacity of 1,200 lux have been set up at the stadium. Seven matches of the home side, Pune Strykers, are scheduled in World Series Hockey between 29 February to 2 April.

See also 

 Annasaheb Magar PCMC Stadium

References

Sports venues in Pimpri-Chinchwad
Sport in Pimpri-Chinchwad
Field hockey venues in Maharashtra
1993 establishments in Maharashtra